Carlos Falt Mont (December 31, 1913 – March 25, 1982) was a Spanish water polo player who competed in the 1948 Summer Olympics.

He was part of the Spanish team which finished eighth in the 1948 tournament. He played all seven matches.

References

Carlos Falt's profile
Catalan Olympians

1913 births
1982 deaths
Spanish male water polo players
Water polo players at the 1948 Summer Olympics
Olympic water polo players of Spain
20th-century Spanish people